The 10th Queen's Own Canadian Hussars (QOCH) was a cavalry regiment of the Non-Permanent Active Militia (this was the name of the part-time volunteer Canadian Armed Forces before the formation of the Canadian Army in 1940) which existed between 1856–1913 and 1928–1936.

Although the unit did not take part in any fixed actions of its own various officers and men were incorporated as volunteers into Canadian Expeditionary Forces overseas such as the Canadian Mounted Rifles in the Second Boer War, where some distinguished themselves such as Lieutenant-General Richard Ernest William Turner who, as a lieutenant serving with the Royal Canadian Dragoons (RCD), won the Victoria Cross at Leliefontein, one of three officers from the RCD who were given the award for the same action.

History
The regiment was originally raised on 13 November 1856 at Quebec City with the name the Queen's Own Canadian Hussars and was, until 1880, the only cavalry regiment in the province of Quebec.

Between 1900 and 1913 it was part of the 4th Cavalry Brigade, 5th Division, in Military District No 5. Renamed the 10th Queen's Own Canadian Hussars in 1903. It was disbanded on 15 August 1913.

On 1 August 1928 the 10th were re-raised, again in Quebec City, but disbanded permanently on 1 February 1936 along with 13 other regiments as part of the 1936 Canadian Militia Reorganization.

Although not sent as a unit to the Second Boer War, some personnel volunteered to serve with the Canadian Mounted Rifles (CMR) which was raised to soldier in that campaign.  Various sources list individuals from the QOCH who were attached to the CMR (First Contingent) such as the following members of "E" Company (Montreal):
Dynes, E. J.
Home, F.
Lee, F.
Sheehan, M.
Tregett, J.

Amongst the number who volunteered for service in South Africa was 29-year-old Richard Ernest William Turner who had been commissioned into the QOCH as a lieutenant, rising to the rank of major.  In order to serve overseas he dropped rank to lieutenant and joined the Royal Canadian Dragoons.  During his service there he gained the Victoria Cross along with two other RCD soldiers, Lt HZC Cockburn and Sgt E Holland.  Turner was given command of the 10th QOCH as a Lt Colonel.  He was eventually promoted to Lt General during World War I although his career finished ignominiously after a friendly fire incident near the town of St. Eloi in September 1916.  This resulted in him being removed from command and given administrative jobs for the rest of his time with the Canadian forces.

Uniform and badge
The uniform was similar to that of Imperial hussar regiments, dark blue with gold frogging on the jacket and a double yellow stripe on the trouser. Unlike other Canadian hussar regiments the QOCH also wore a busby similar to their Imperial cousins.  The rest of the Canadian hussars (with the exception of the 8th) wore a white pith helmet until they replaced them with busbies in the early 1900s.

The badge had a blackened silver maple leaf is the central device and was attached to the main body by two pins.  The rest of the badge is gilded.  The collar dogs (badges worn on the lapel) were all gilt.

Notable Members
Lt General Richard Ernest William Turner VC, DSO, MiD

See also

 List of regiments of cavalry of the Canadian Militia (1900–1920)
 History of the Canadian Army
 Canadian Forces
 Permanent Active Militia
 Non-Permanent Active Militia
 The Canadian Crown and the Canadian Forces
 List of units of the Canadian Army
 Canadian Forces order of precedence

References

External links

Hussar regiments of Canada
Military units and formations of Quebec
Military units and formations established in 1856
1856 establishments in Canada
1913 disestablishments in Canada
1928 establishments in Canada
1928 establishments in Quebec
1936 disestablishments in Canada
Military units and formations disestablished in 1936

Canadian military history articles needing attention to coverage and accuracy
Canadian military history articles needing attention to referencing and citation
Canadian military history articles needing attention to supporting materials